A friendly settlement is a term used in international law where the parties of the dispute come to an agreement which is accepted by an international court. They are encouraged by the European Court of Human Rights and the Inter-American Court of Human Rights.

References

International law